Mare Anguis  (Latin anguis, the "serpent sea") is a lunar mare located on the near side of the Moon, about 150 kilometers in diameter. Located within the Crisium basin, Mare Anguis is a part of the Nectarian System, meaning that it was formed during the Nectarian time period. Like most mare, the surface of Mare Anguis is dark, indicating that it has been filled with volcanic basalt. It forms part of a concentric ring to the northeast of the Crisium rim, and it lies at an elevation 800 m above Mare Crisium. Channels lead down from Mare Anguis to Mare Chrisium, with some possible indications of lava flow.

The small, 7–km diameter crater Eimmart A lies at the east edge of Mare Anguis. It is a proposed source for the Antarctic meteorite ALHA81005. The impact appears to have excavated mare basalt, which probably accounts for the olivine/low-Ca pyroxene mixture found in the spectrum.

See also
Volcanism on the Moon

References

Anguis
Anguis